Behind the Lines may refer to:

Books
Behind the Lines: The Year's Best Cartoons 2010 National Museum of Australia
Behind the Lines: Hanoi, December 23-January 7 Harrison E. Salisbury 1967
 Behind the Lines (novel), a 1930 novel by W. F. Morris
 Behind the Lines (book), a 2005 collection of letters written by soldiers during the wars in American history

Film and TV
 Behind the Lines (1916 film), a 1916 film starring Harry Carey
 Behind the Lines (1997 film), Regeneration (1997 film) or Behind the Lines, a 1997 film
 "Behind the Lines" (Star Trek: Deep Space Nine), an episode of Star Trek: Deep Space Nine
Behind the Lines, 1985 BBC Television documentary series Mountain Leader Training Cadre

Music
Behind the Lines Cecil Coles
 Behind the Lines (John Schumann album)
 Behind the Lines (David Knopfler album)
Behind the Lines, John Schumann and the Vagabond Crew
 "Behind the Lines" (Genesis song)

See also
 Behind Enemy Lines (disambiguation)